Quezaltepeque may refer to:

El Salvador
 Quezaltepeque, La Libertad
 Quezaltepec (volcano)

Guatemala
Quezaltepeque, Chiquimula
Quezaltepeque (volcano)